Without Family, originally released as Senza famiglia, nullatenenti cercano affetto (literally No family, no property, looking for affection), is a 1972 Italian comedy film directed by Vittorio Gassman.

Cast 
 Vittorio Gassman: Armando Tavanati
 Paolo Villaggio: Agostino Antoniucci
 Enzo Robutti: Malato 
 Rossana Di Lorenzo: Mrs. Antoniucci
 Isa Bellini: Old Gipsy from Campobasso
 Giancarlo Fusco: Cesare
 Corrado Gaipa: Judge
 Augusto Mastrantoni: Giuseppe
 Toni Ucci: Nurse
 Carlo Delle Piane: Nurse
 Liù Bosisio: Orphanage Director

References

External links

1972 films
Italian comedy films
1972 comedy films
Films with screenplays by Age & Scarpelli
Films scored by Fiorenzo Carpi
1970s Italian films